Microgale grandidieri, also known as Grandidier's shrew tenrec, is a species of shrew tenrec occurring in the dry forests of western and southwestern Madagascar. Populations of this species were formerly included in Microgale brevicaudata; M. grandidieri was described as a separate species in 2009 based on differences in morphology and DNA sequences.

References

Afrosoricida
Mammals of Madagascar
Mammals described in 2009